Bioleaching is the extraction of metals from their ores through the use of living organisms. This is much cleaner than the traditional heap leaching using cyanide. Bioleaching is one of several applications within biohydrometallurgy and several methods are used to recover copper, zinc, lead,  arsenic, antimony, nickel, molybdenum, gold, silver, and cobalt.

Process 
Bioleaching can involve numerous ferrous iron and sulfur oxidizing bacteria, including Acidithiobacillus ferrooxidans (formerly known as Thiobacillus ferrooxidans) and Acidithiobacillus thiooxidans  (formerly known as Thiobacillus thiooxidans). As a general principle, Fe3+ ions are used to oxidize the ore. This step is entirely independent of microbes. The role of the bacteria is further oxidation of the ore, but also the regeneration of the chemical oxidant Fe3+ from Fe2+. For example, bacteria catalyse the breakdown of the mineral pyrite (FeS2) by oxidising the sulfur and metal (in this case ferrous iron, (Fe2+)) using oxygen. This yields soluble products that can be further purified and refined to yield the desired metal.

Pyrite leaching (FeS2):
In the first step, disulfide is spontaneously oxidized to thiosulfate by ferric ion (Fe3+), which in turn is reduced to give ferrous ion (Fe2+):
(1)       spontaneous

The ferrous ion is then oxidized by bacteria using oxygen:
(2)       (iron oxidizers)

Thiosulfate is also oxidized by bacteria to give sulfate:
(3)       (sulfur oxidizers)

The ferric ion produced in reaction (2) oxidized more sulfide as in reaction (1), closing the cycle and given the net reaction:
(4)  

The net products of the reaction are soluble ferrous sulfate and sulfuric acid.

The microbial oxidation process occurs at the cell membrane of the bacteria. The electrons pass into the cells and are used in biochemical processes to produce energy for the bacteria while reducing oxygen to water. The critical reaction is the oxidation of sulfide by ferric iron. The main role of the bacterial step is the regeneration of this reactant.

The process for copper is very similar, but the efficiency and kinetics depend on the copper mineralogy. The most efficient minerals are supergene minerals such as chalcocite, Cu2S and covellite, CuS. The main copper mineral chalcopyrite (CuFeS2) is not leached very efficiently, which is why the dominant copper-producing technology remains flotation, followed by smelting and refining. The leaching of CuFeS2 follows the two stages of being dissolved and then further oxidised, with Cu2+ ions being left in solution.

Chalcopyrite leaching:
(1)       spontaneous
(2)       (iron oxidizers)
(3)       (sulfur oxidizers)
net reaction:
(4)  

In general, sulfides are first oxidized to elemental sulfur, whereas disulfides are oxidized to give thiosulfate, and the processes above can be applied to other sulfidic ores. Bioleaching of non-sulfidic ores such as pitchblende also uses ferric iron as an oxidant (e.g., UO2 + 2 Fe3+ ==> UO22+ + 2 Fe2+). In this case, the sole purpose of the bacterial step is the regeneration of Fe3+. Sulfidic iron ores can be added to speed up the process and provide a source of iron.  Bioleaching of non-sulfidic ores by layering of waste sulfides and elemental sulfur, colonized by Acidithiobacillus spp., has been accomplished, which provides a strategy for accelerated leaching of materials that do not contain sulfide minerals.

Further processing 
The dissolved copper (Cu2+) ions are removed from the solution by ligand exchange solvent extraction, which leaves other ions in the solution. The copper is removed by bonding to a ligand, which is a large molecule consisting of a number of smaller groups, each possessing a lone electron pair. The ligand-copper complex is extracted from the solution using an organic solvent such as kerosene:

Cu2+(aq) + 2LH(organic) → CuL2(organic) + 2H+(aq)

The ligand donates electrons to the copper, producing a complex - a central metal atom (copper) bonded to the ligand. Because this complex has no charge, it is no longer attracted to polar water molecules and dissolves in the kerosene, which is then easily separated from the solution. Because the initial reaction is reversible, it is determined by pH. Adding concentrated acid reverses the equation, and the copper ions go back into an aqueous solution.

Then the copper is passed through an electro-winning process to increase its purity: An electric current is passed through the resulting solution of copper ions. Because copper ions have a 2+ charge, they are attracted to the negative cathodes and collect there.

The copper can also be concentrated and separated by displacing the copper with Fe from scrap iron:

Cu2+(aq) + Fe(s) → Cu(s) + Fe2+(aq)

The electrons lost by the iron are taken up by the copper. Copper is the oxidising agent (it accepts electrons), and iron is the reducing agent (it loses electrons).

Traces of precious metals such as gold may be left in the original solution. Treating the mixture with sodium cyanide in the presence of free oxygen dissolves the gold. The gold is removed from the solution by adsorbing (taking it up on the surface) to charcoal.

With fungi
Several species of fungi can be used for bioleaching. Fungi can be grown on many different substrates, such as electronic scrap, catalytic converters, and fly ash from municipal waste incineration. Experiments have shown that two fungal strains (Aspergillus niger, Penicillium simplicissimum) were able to mobilize Cu and Sn by 65%, and Al, Ni, Pb, and Zn by more than 95%. Aspergillus niger can produce some organic acids such as citric acid. This form of leaching does not rely on microbial oxidation of metal but rather uses microbial metabolism as source of acids that directly dissolve the metal.

Feasibility

Economic feasibility
Bioleaching is in general simpler and, therefore, cheaper to operate and maintain than traditional processes, since fewer specialists are needed to operate complex chemical plants. And low concentrations are not a problem for bacteria because they simply ignore the waste that surrounds the metals, attaining extraction yields of over 90% in some cases. These microorganisms actually gain energy by breaking down minerals into their constituent elements. The company simply collects the ions out of the solution after the bacteria have finished.

Bioleaching can be used to extract metals from low concentration ores such as gold that are too poor for other technologies. It can be used to partially replace the extensive crushing and grinding that translates to prohibitive cost and energy consumption in a conventional process. Because the lower cost of bacterial leaching outweighs the time it takes to extract the metal.

High concentration ores, such as copper, are more economical to smelt rather bioleach due to the slow speed of the bacterial leaching process compared to smelting. The slow speed of bioleaching introduces a significant delay in cash flow for new mines. Nonetheless, at the largest copper mine of the world, Escondida in Chile the process seems to be favorable.

Economically it is also very expensive and many companies once started can not keep up with the demand and end up in debt.

In space

In 2020 scientists showed, with an experiment with different gravity environments on the ISS, that microorganisms could be employed to mine useful elements from basaltic rocks via bioleaching in space.

Environmental impact 
The process is more environmentally friendly than traditional extraction methods.  For the company this can translate into profit, since the necessary limiting of sulfur dioxide emissions during smelting is expensive. Less landscape damage occurs, since the bacteria involved grow naturally, and the mine and surrounding area can be left relatively untouched. As the bacteria breed in the conditions of the mine, they are easily cultivated and recycled.

Toxic chemicals are sometimes produced in the process. Sulfuric acid and H+ ions that have been formed can leak into the ground and surface water turning it acidic, causing environmental damage. Heavy ions such as iron, zinc, and arsenic leak during acid mine drainage. When the pH of this solution rises, as a result of dilution by fresh water, these ions precipitate, forming "Yellow Boy" pollution. For these reasons, a setup of bioleaching must be carefully planned, since the process can lead to a biosafety failure. Unlike other methods, once started, bioheap leaching cannot be quickly stopped, because leaching would still continue with rainwater and natural bacteria. Projects like Finnish Talvivaara proved to be environmentally and economically disastrous.

See also 

 Phytomining

References

Further reading 
 T. A. Fowler and F. K. Crundwell – "Leaching of zinc sulfide with Thiobacillus ferrooxidans"
 Brandl H. (2001) "Microbial leaching of metals". In: Rehm H. J. (ed.) Biotechnology, Vol. 10. Wiley-VCH, Weinheim, pp. 191–224

Biotechnology
Economic geology
Metallurgical processes
Applied microbiology